Carlos Paula Conill (November 28, 1927 – April 25, 1983) was a Major League Baseball right fielder who played for the Washington Senators from 1954 to 1956. A native of Havana, Cuba, he stood 6'3" and weighed 195 lbs.

Paula was acquired by Washington via a transaction with the Paris Indians Big State League before the 1954 season. He was sent to the Senators Charlotte, North Carolina affiliate, the Charlotte Hornets, on March 30, 1954.  When he made his major league debut (September 6, 1954 at Griffith Stadium), he became the first black player in Washington Senators history. He got into nine games that month.

He played in 115 games during the 1955 season, batting .299 with 6 home runs and 55 runs batted in. In 1956 he appeared in only 33 games and batted .183.  His last game was on June 23. Paula was optioned to the Minneapolis Millers of the American Association on April 2, 1957. On April 12, 1958 he was sold by the Senators to the
Sacramento Solons of the Pacific Coast League.

Career totals for 157 games include a .271 batting average (124-for-457), 9 HR, 60 RBI, 44 runs scored, and a slugging percentage of .416. In his 111 appearances in the outfield, he handled 211 out of 222 total chances successfully for a fielding percentage of .950, well below the league average during his era.

Paula died at the age of 55 in Miami, Florida.

See also
List of first black Major League Baseball players by team and date

References

External links

Baseball Integration Timeline

1927 births
1983 deaths
Charlotte Hornets (baseball) players
Decatur Commodores players
Denver Bears players
Havana Sugar Kings players
Louisville Colonels (minor league) players
Major League Baseball players from Cuba
Cuban expatriate baseball players in the United States
Major League Baseball right fielders
Miami Marlins (IL) players
Minneapolis Millers (baseball) players
Paris Indians players
People from Havana
Sacramento Solons players
Tigres del México players
Washington Senators (1901–1960) players
Cuban expatriate baseball players in Mexico